is a train station on the  Osaka Metro Imazatosuji Line in Higashiyodogawa-ku, Osaka, Japan. It is one of two nearest stations to Osaka University of Economics as well as Kami-Shinjo Station on the Hankyu Railway Kyoto Line.

Layout
There is an island platform with two tracks underground.  The platform is fenced with platform gates.

Higashiyodogawa-ku, Osaka
Osaka Metro stations
Railway stations in Japan opened in 2006